Dundalk entered the 1966–67 season on the back of a disappointing eighth-place finish in the League and a sixth-place finish in the Shield the previous season. 1966–67 was Alan Fox's first season as player-coach, having been appointed by the club's new board of directors in August. It was Dundalk's 41st consecutive season in the top tier of Irish football.

Season summary
The previous season had seen significant change at the club. By the end of 1965 it was clear that the debts, the condition of Oriel Park, and the need to rebuild the playing squad, were challenges beyond the membership-based ownership model. A new public limited company took the club over in January 1966, after the voluntary liquidation of the old company. The new board set about investing in Oriel Park, which consisted of turning the pitch 90 degrees, building a new stand, and adding player and spectator facilities. They also invested in a number of new players and a new player-coach, Alan Fox. Only five of the players who had finished the previous season were retained.

The new season started on 21 August 1966 with the Shield and the Dublin City Cup. Dundalk had never won the Shield in their 40 seasons of League of Ireland membership, being runners-up four times and going close in numerous seasons. At the 41st attempt, the new team made no mistake – with nine wins from the first 10 matches, effectively sealing the win with a 2–0 victory over Shamrock Rovers in front of a then record crowd of 14,000 for a domestic game in Oriel Park. 10 days later they met Shamrock Rovers again, this time in the City Cup final, but fell to a 2–1 defeat.

The League saw Fox's side continue their Shield form, with six wins in a row (scoring 21 goals in the process) leaving them clear at the top of the table in the run up to Christmas. A three match losing streak through the new year, which included the Leinster Senior Cup Final, saw some doubts about the side creep in. But they only lost one more match in charging to the title ahead of Bohemians by seven points. The club's third League title brought the only League and Shield Double in its history. To cap a memorable season, they also won the Top Four Cup, their second and last win before the competition was discontinued in 1974. A semi-final defeat in the FAI Cup to Shamrock Rovers was the only slip-up that stopped the side winning medals in every competition. They called it "the greatest year in the history of Dundalk Football Club".

First-Team Squad (1966–67)
Sources:

a. Includes the Leinster Senior Cup, Dublin City Cup, and Top Four Cup.

Competitions

Shield
Source:

Shield table

Dublin City Cup
Source:
First Round

Quarter-final

Semi-final

Final

Leinster Senior Cup
Source:
Fourth Round

Semi-final

Semi-final Replay

Final

FAI Cup
Source:
First Round

Quarter-final

Quarter-final Replay

Semi-final

Semi-final Replay

Top Four Cup
Source:
Semi-final

Final

Final Replay

League
Source:

League table

References
Bibliography

Citations

Dundalk F.C. seasons
Dundalk